The 2000 West Berkshire Council election took place on 4 May 2000 to elect members of West Berkshire Council in Berkshire, England. The whole council was up for election and the Liberal Democrats stayed in overall control of the council.

Election result

By-elections between 2000 and 2003

References

2000
2000 English local elections
2000s in Berkshire